Pinto Creek, formerly known as Piedra Pinto Creek, a tributary to the Rio Grande in Kinney County, Texas.

History
The San Antonio-El Paso Road crossed Piedra Pinto Creek  7.0 miles west of Fort Clarke.  The crossing was 8.86 miles east of Maverick Creek and 21.47 miles east of San Felipe Springs.  Teamsters, and other travelers and the San Antonio-El Paso Mail and San Antonio-San Diego Mail Line used this crossing as a water stop.

See also
List of rivers of Texas

References

Tributaries of the Rio Grande
Rivers of Kinney County, Texas
San Antonio–El Paso Road
Rivers of Texas